ALNAP (Active Learning Network for Accountability and Performance) is a UK based non-profit organization that works to increase learning and accountability in the humanitarian aid sector.

It produces The State of the Humanitarian System report every two to three years.

History 
ALNAP was created to increase learning and accountability in the humanitarian sector in the aftermath of the Rwandan genocide.

Selected publications 
In 2010 ALNAP released the first The State of the Humanitarian System report, which was updated in 2012, 2015 and 2018.

It released the report Urban services during protracted armed conflict: A call for a better approach to assisting affected people in 2015.

Members
ALNAP is a membership organization. As of January 2022 it had 86 full members and 16 Associate members.

References

External links
 Official website

Charities based in London
Humanitarian aid organizations
International organisations based in London
Organisations based in the London Borough of Southwark